The Evening News EP is the second EP by American hip hop duo 1982, composed of Statik Selektah and Termanology.

Track listing 
All songs produced by Statik Selektah.

External links 
 1982 (Statik Selektah & Termanology) – The Evening News EP at hiphopisdream.com.

2010 EPs
Termanology albums
Statik Selektah albums
Albums produced by Statik Selektah